Simon Lien Andreassen (born 30 September 1997) is a Danish male cyclist competing in cyclo-cross and mountainbike. He competed in the men's under-23 event at the 2016 UCI Cyclo-cross World Championships  in Heusden-Zolder.

Major results

Mountain Bike

2014
 1st  Cross-country, UCI World Junior Championships
 1st  Cross-country, UEC European Junior Championships
 1st  Cross-country, National Junior Championships
2015
 UCI World Championships
1st  Junior Cross-country
2nd  Team relay
 1st  Cross-country, UEC European Junior Championships
 1st  Cross-country, National Junior Championships
2016
 1st  Cross-country, National Championships
2017
 2nd  Team relay, UCI World Championships
 3rd  Cross-country, UEC European Under-23 Championships
 3rd Cross-country, National Championships
2018
 1st  Marathon, National Championships
 3rd  Team relay, UCI World Championships
2020
 1st  Cross-country, National Championships
 UCI XCO World Cup
1st Nové Město I
 3rd  Cross-country, UCI World E-MTB Championships
2021
 1st  Cross-country, National Championships
 1st  Marathon, National Championships
2022
 3rd  Marathon, UCI World Championships

Cyclo cross
2013–2014
 1st  National Junior Championships
2014–2015
 1st  UCI World Junior Championships
 1st  National Junior Championships
 UCI Junior World Cup
3rd Citadelcross
2015–2016
 1st  National Championships
2016–2017
 1st  National Championships
2021–2022
 1st  National Championships

References

External links

1997 births
Living people
Cyclo-cross cyclists
Danish male cyclists
Sportspeople from Odense
Olympic cyclists of Denmark
Cyclists at the 2016 Summer Olympics